Paramoera is a genus of amphipods in the family Pontogeneiidae. It contains the following species:

Paramoera aucklandica (Walker, 1908)
Paramoera bidentata K. H. Barnard, 1932
Paramoera brachyura Schellenberg, 1931
Paramoera capensis (Dana, 1853)
Paramoera chevreuxi (Stephensen, 1927)
Paramoera edouardi Schellenberg, 1929
Paramoera falklandica Vader & Krapp, 2005
Paramoera fasciculata (Thomson, 1880)
Paramoera fissicauda (Dana, 1852)
Paramoera gregaria (Pfeffe,r 1888)
Paramoera hamiltoni Nicholls, 1938
Paramoera hermitensis K. H. Barnard, 1932
Paramoera hurleyi Thurston, 1974
Paramoera husvikensis Thurston, 1974
Paramoera incognita Bushueva, 1986
Paramoera kergueleni Bellan-Santini & Ledoyer, 1974
Paramoera macquariae Nicholls, 1938
Paramoera obliquimana K. H., Barnard 1932
Paramoera parva Ruffo, 1949
Paramoera pfefferi Schellenberg, 1931
Paramoera schellenbergi Nicholls, 1938
Paramoera tristanensis K. H. Barnard, 1932
Paramoera walkeri (Stebbing, 1906)

References

Gammaridea
Taxa named by Edward J. Miers